Ludwig II (3 April 1439, in Waiblingen – 3 November 1457, in Urach) was the Count of Württemberg. He was the son of count Ludwig I and Mechthild of the Palatinate. He reigned from 1450 until 1457.

After the division of the County of Württemberg, by the Treaty of Nürtingen in 1442, he was raised in Urach, capital of the newly created County of Württemberg-Stuttgart.
After the early death of his father, Ludwig I, a conflict over his tutelage arose. In the end, the count of Württemberg-Stuttgart, his uncle Ulrich V, won influence. Finally Ludwig II was declared full of age and took responsibility for the government at the age of 14.

Due to his ill health, he died prematurely in 1457 at the age of 18.

References

1439 births
1457 deaths
15th-century counts of Württemberg
People from Waiblingen